Andrea Peron is the name of two Italian cyclists:

Andrea Peron (cyclist, born 1971)
Andrea Peron (cyclist, born 1988)